G0y, gØy, g-zero-y (pronounced "goy" or "g-zero-y"; the second character is the digit zero, not the letter o) is a subculture that appeared in the 2000s in the United States and has since spread to Brazil. The g0y self-identify as men who are attracted to men, but not as homosexual or bisexual. In such relationships, men consider hugging, kissing on lips, caressing, frotting, French kissing, mutual masturbation and fellatio as acceptable. They do not participate in anal sex, seeing it as gay or even violent and dangerous.

The g0y movement is inspired by the practices of Ancient Greece (but not the sexual practices of ancient Rome, where men had sex with men). Its adherents do not fight to be included in the so-called LGBT civil movements. According to this same philosophy, G0ys do not like to be compared to members of the LGBT civil movements, because they do not practice penetration with other men.

See also 
Heteroflexibility
Latent homosexuality
Bicurious
Frot
Homoeroticism

References 

LGBT culture
LGBT culture in Brazil
LGBT culture in the United States
 
Same-sex sexuality
Subcultures